The pressure-fed engine is a class of rocket engine designs. A separate gas supply, usually helium, pressurizes the propellant tanks to force fuel and oxidizer to the combustion chamber. To maintain adequate flow, the tank pressures must exceed the combustion chamber pressure.

Pressure fed engines have simple plumbing and have no need for complex and occasionally unreliable turbopumps. A typical startup procedure begins with opening a valve, often a one-shot pyrotechnic device, to allow the pressurizing gas to flow through check valves into the propellant tanks. Then the propellant valves in the engine itself are opened. If the fuel and oxidizer are hypergolic, they burn on contact; non-hypergolic fuels require an igniter. Multiple burns can be conducted by merely opening and closing the propellant valves as needed, if the pressurization system also has activating valves. They can be operated electrically, or by gas pressure controlled by smaller electrically operated valves.

Care must be taken, especially during long burns, to avoid excessive cooling of the pressurizing gas due to adiabatic expansion. Cold helium won't liquify, but it could freeze a propellant, decrease tank pressures, or damage components not designed for low temperatures. The Apollo Lunar Module Descent Propulsion System was unusual in storing its helium in a supercritical but very cold state. It was warmed as it was withdrawn through a heat exchanger from the ambient temperature fuel.

Spacecraft attitude control and orbital maneuvering thrusters are almost universally pressure-fed designs.
Examples include the Reaction Control (RCS) and the Orbital Maneuvering (OMS) engines of the Space Shuttle orbiter; the RCS and Service Propulsion System (SPS) engines on the Apollo Command/Service Module; the SuperDraco (in-flight abort) and Draco (RCS) engines on the SpaceX Dragon 2; and the RCS, ascent and descent engines on the Apollo Lunar Module.

Some launcher upper stages also use pressure-fed engines. These include the Aerojet AJ10 and TRW TR-201 used in the second stage of Delta II launch vehicle, 
and the Kestrel engine of the Falcon 1 by SpaceX.

The 1960s Sea Dragon concept by Robert Truax for a big dumb booster would have used pressure-fed engines.

Pressure-fed engines have practical limits on propellant pressure, which in turn limits combustion chamber pressure.  High pressure propellant tanks require thicker walls and stronger alloys which make the vehicle tanks heavier, thereby reducing performance and payload capacity.  The lower stages of launch vehicles often use either solid fuel or pump-fed liquid fuel engines instead, where high pressure ratio nozzles are considered desirable.

Other vehicles or companies using pressure-fed engine:
OTRAG (rocket)
Quad (rocket) of Armadillo Aerospace
XCOR EZ-Rocket of XCOR Aerospace
Masten Space Systems
Aquarius Launch Vehicle
NASA's Project Morpheus prototype lander
NASA Mighty Eagle mini lunar lander
CONAE's Tronador II upper stage
Copenhagen Suborbitals' Spica

See also
Gas-generator cycle
Combustion tap-off cycle
Expander cycle
Staged combustion cycle

References

External links
Rocket power cycles

Rocket propulsion
Rocket engines
 
Thermodynamics